Each "article" in this category is a collection of entries about several stamp issuers, presented in alphabetical order. The entries are formulated on the micro model and so provide summary information about all known issuers.  

See the :Category:Compendium of postage stamp issuers page for details of the project.

Ionian Islands 

Dates 	1859 – 1864
Capital 	Argostolion (Cephalonia)
Currency 	12 pence = 1 shilling; 20 shillings = 1 pound

Main Article Needed 

See also 	Cephalonia and Ithaca (Italian Occupation);
		Corfu (Italian Occupation);
		Corfu & Paxos (Italian Occupation);
		Ionian Islands (Italian Occupation);
		Zante (German Occupation)

Ionian Islands (German Occupation) 

Refer 	Zante (German Occupation)

Ionian Islands (Italian Occupation) 

Dates 	1941 – 1943

Refer 	Italian Occupation Issues

See also 	Cephalonia and Ithaca (Italian Occupation);
		Corfu (Italian Occupation);
		Corfu & Paxos (Italian Occupation);
		Zante (German Occupation)

Iran 

Dates 	1935 –
Capital 	Tehran
Currency 	(1868) 20 shahis = 1 kran; 10 krans = 1 toman
		(1881) 100 centimes = 1 franc
		(1885) 20 chahis = 1 kran; 10 krans = 1 toman
		(1932) 100 dinars = 1 rial; 20 rials = 1 pahlavi

Main Article  Postage stamps and postal history of Iran

Includes 	Persia

Iraq 

Dates 	1923 –
Capital 	Baghdad
Currency 	(1923) 16 annas = 1 rupee
		(1931) 1000 fils = 1 dinar

Iraq (British Occupation) 

Dates 	1918 – 1923
Currency 	16 annas = 1 rupee

Refer 	British Occupation Issues

Ireland 

Refer 	Northern Ireland;
		Republic of Ireland

Irian Barat 

Refer 	West Irian

Island 

Refer 	Iceland

Isle of Man 
Isle of Man Post
Dates 	1973 –
Capital 	Douglas
Currency 	100 pence = 1 pound

Main Article  Postage stamps and postal history of the Isle of Man

See also 	Great Britain (Regional Issues)

Isole Italiane dell' Egeo 

Refer 	Aegean Islands (Dodecanese)

Isole Jonie 

Refer 	Ionian Islands (Italian Occupation)

Israel 

Dates 	1948 –
Capital 	Jerusalem (claimed)
Currency 	(1948) 1000 prutot (mils) = 1 Israeli pound
		(1960) 100 agorot = 1 pound
		(1980) 100 agorot = 1 shekel

Main Article  Postage stamps and postal history of Israel

Istria 

Refer 	Venezia Giulia & Istria

Istria (Yugoslav Occupation) 

Dates 	1945 only
Currency 	100 centesimi = 1 lira

Refer 	Venezia Giulia & Istria

ITA-Karjala 

Refer 	Eastern Karelia (Finnish Occupation)

Italian Austria 

Refer 	Dalmatia (Italian Occupation);
		Trentino (Italian Occupation);
		Venezia Giulia (Italian Occupation)

Italian Colonies (General Issues) 

Dates 	1932 – 1934
Currency 	100 centesimi = 1 lira

Main Article Needed

Italian Colonies (British Occupation) 

Refer 	BA/BMA Issues;
		Cyrenaica (British Occupation);
		Dodecanese Islands (British Occupation);
		East Africa Forces;
		Eritrea (British Occupation);
		Middle East Forces (MEF);
		Somalia (British Occupation);
		Tripolitania (British Occupation)

Italian East Africa 

Dates 	1936 – 1941
Capital 	Addis Ababa
Currency 	100 centsimi = 1 lira

Main Article  Postage stamps and postal history of Italian East Africa

Italian Levant 

Refer 	Italian Post Offices in the Turkish Empire

Italian Occupation Issues 

Main Article Needed 

Includes 	Albania (Italian Occupation);
		Cephalonia and Ithaca (Italian Occupation);
		Corfu (Italian Occupation);
		Corfu & Paxos (Italian Occupation);
		Dalmatia (Italian Occupation);
		Ethiopia (Italian Occupation);
		Fiume & Kupa Zone (Italian Occupation);
		Ionian Islands (Italian Occupation);
		Lubiana (Italian Occupation);
		Montenegro (Italian Occupation);
		Saseno (Italian Occupation);
		Trentino (Italian Occupation);
		Venezia Giulia (Italian Occupation)

See also 	Castelrosso (Kastellorizon)

Italian Post Offices Abroad 

Main Article Needed 

Includes 	Alexandria (Italian Post Office);
		Crete (Italian Post Offices);
		Khania (Italian Post Office);
		Pechino (Italian Post Office);
		Tientsin (Italian Post Office)

See also 	Italian Post Offices in the Turkish Empire

Italian Post Offices in the Turkish Empire 

Dates 	1873 – 1923
Currency 	(1873) 40 paras = 1 piastre
		(1908) 100 centesimi = 1 lira

Main Article Needed 

Includes 	Benghazi (Italian Post Office);
		Constantinople (Italian Post Office);
		Durazzo (Italian Post Office);
		Jannina (Italian Post Office);
		Jerusalem (Italian Post Office);
		Salonika (Italian Post Office);
		Scutari (Italian Post Office);
		Smirne (Italian Post Office);
		Tripoli (Italian Post Office);
		Valona (Italian Post Office)

Italian Social Republic 

Dates 	1944 – 1945
Capital 	Salò (Lake Garda)
Currency 	100 centesimi = 1 lira

Refer 	Italy

Italian Somaliland 

Dates 	1905 – 1936
Capital 	Mogadishu
Currency 	100 centesimi = 1 lira

Main Article Needed 

Includes 	Benadir

See also 	British Occupation Issues;
		Italian East Africa;
		Jubaland;
		Somalia

Italian States 

Main Article Needed 

Includes 	Modena;
		Naples;
		Neapolitan Provinces;
		Papal States;
		Parma;
		Piedmont;
		Romagna;
		Sicily;
		Tuscany

See also 	Sardinia

Italy 

Dates 	1862 –
Capital 	Rome
Currency 	(1862) 100 centesimi = 1 lira
		(2002) 100 cent = 1 euro

Includes 	Italian Social Republic

Italy (Austrian Occupation) 

Dates 	1918 only
Currency 	100 centesimi = 1 lira

Refer 	Austro-Hungarian Military Post

Ithaca (Italian Occupation) 

Refer 	Cephalonia and Ithaca (Italian Occupation)

Ivory Coast 

Dates 	1959 –
Capital 	Abidjan
Currency 	100 centimes = 1 franc

Main Article  Postage stamps and postal history of Ivory Coast

Includes 	Ivory Coast (French Colony)

See also 	French West Africa

Ivory Coast (French Colony) 

Dates 	1892 – 1944
Capital 	Abidjan
Currency 	100 centimes = 1 franc

Refer 	Ivory Coast

References

Bibliography
 Stanley Gibbons Ltd, Europe and Colonies 1970, Stanley Gibbons Ltd, 1969
 Stanley Gibbons Ltd, various catalogues
 Stuart Rossiter & John Flower, The Stamp Atlas, W H Smith, 1989
 XLCR Stamp Finder and Collector's Dictionary, Thomas Cliffe Ltd, c.1960

External links
 AskPhil – Glossary of Stamp Collecting Terms
 Encyclopaedia of Postal History

Ionia